The 2023 Saudi Cup was a horse race that took place at King Abdulaziz Racetrack in Riyadh on 25 February 2023. It was the fourth running of the race, and the second after it was promoted to Group 1 status. The total prize money for the race was $20 million, with the winner receiving $10 million.

Race

Entries

A maximum field of 13 runners was declared for the race, including 2022 Saudi Cup winner Emblem Road. Other notable entries included the 2022 Malibu Stakes winner Taiba.

Result

See also

2023 Dubai World Cup

References

External links

Saudi Cup

Saudi Cup
Saudi Cup
Saudi Cup
Saudi Cup